The 2022–23 season is the 56th in the history of AZ Alkmaar and their 25th consecutive season in the top flight. The club are participating in the Eredivisie, the KNVB Cup, and the UEFA Europa Conference League.

Players 
{{updated|1 September 2022|<ref>

Out on loan

Pre-season and friendlies

Competitions

Overall record

Eredivisie

League table

Results summary

Results by round

Matches 
The league fixtures were announced on 14 June 2022.

KNVB Cup

UEFA Europa Conference League

Second qualifying round
The draw for the second qualifying round was held on 15 June 2022.

Third qualifying round 
The draw for the third qualifying round was held on 18 July 2022.

Play-off round 
The draw for the play-off round was held on 2 August 2022.

Group stage 

The draw for the group stage was held on 26 August 2022.

Knockout phase

Round of 16

Quarter-finals

References 

AZ Alkmaar seasons
AZ
2022–23 UEFA Europa Conference League participants seasons